Grigoriy Grigorievich Myasoyedov (19 April 1834, in Pankovo, Tula Governorate – 31 December 1911, in Poltava) was a Russian Realist painter associated with the Peredvizhniki movement.

Biography 
His father was a member of the minor gentry, and was the author of a book titled The Statistical Economic Review of the Southern Part of Tula Guberniya. He began his education at the Gymnasium in Oryol, but didn't complete his studies before enrolling at the Imperial Academy of Arts, where his instructors were Timofey Neff and Alexey Tarasovich Markov.   In 1862, he received a gold medal for his painting "The Flight of Grigory Otrepyev from the Inn" (a scene from Boris Godunov by Pushkin).

Having received a stipend for travelling from the Academy, he visited Paris, Florence, Rome and Spain on study trips. Upon returning to Russia in 1870, he was named an Academician. Shortly thereafter, he became one of the founders of the "Association of Travelling Art Exhibitions" (Peredvizhniki), remaining a fervent participant and supporter for the rest of his life. In 1876, he went to live on a farm near Kharkiv and began to create sympathetic portrayals of peasant life.

From 1861 to 1881, he was married to the pianist Ekaterina Krivtsova, but separated from her when she was pregnant with his son , on the suspicion that Ivan was not his child. He remarried shortly after (to the artist Kseniya Ivanova), but his suspicions lingered and he wouldn't allow Kseniya to treat Ivan as a son. For several years, Ivan was placed in the care of Myasoyedov's friend and colleague, Alexander Kiselyov.

In 1883 Myasoyedov was the model for Ivan the Terrible in Ilya Repin's painting Ivan the Terrible and His Son Ivan.

In 1889, he acquired a large manor house in Poltava, complete with a park, ponds and gardens, where Ivan rejoined the family. While there, he painted a curtain and designed scenery for the local theater. He also organized an art school in 1894 and wrote a book about gardening. He resigned from the Academy in 1902, in protest over their teaching methods.

Although he worked on a variety of subjects, he always had a fondness for religious painting and was planning a triptych of "Holy Russia" when he died.

Selected paintings

References

Further reading 
 Natalya Vladimirovna Masalina, Мясоедов, Moscow, Искусство (1964)

External links 

 Biography, appreciation and selected works @ Russian Painting
 Myasoyedov Street, with biography @ Poltava History

1834 births
1911 deaths
People from Oryol Oblast
People from Novosilsky Uyezd
Russian nobility
Peredvizhniki
19th-century painters from the Russian Empire
Russian male painters
Russian realist painters
20th-century Russian painters
19th-century male artists from the Russian Empire
20th-century Russian male artists